The 2003 Abierto Mexicano Telefonica Movistar was a tennis tournament played on outdoor clay courts at the Fairmont Acapulco Princess in Acapulco in Mexico that was part of the International Series Gold of the 2003 ATP Tour and of Tier III of the 2003 WTA Tour. The tournament was held from February 24 through March 2, 2003.

Finals

Men's singles

 Agustín Calleri defeated  Mariano Zabaleta 7–5, 3–6, 6–3
 It was Calleri's 2nd title of the year and the 2nd of his career.

Women's singles

 Amanda Coetzer defeated  Mariana Díaz Oliva 7–5, 6–3
 It was Coetzer's only title of the year and the 9th of her career.

Men's doubles

 Mark Knowles /  Daniel Nestor defeated  David Ferrer /  Fernando Vicente 6–3, 6–3
 It was Knowles' 2nd title of the year and the 26th of his career. It was Nestor's 2nd title of the year and the 28th of his career.

Women's doubles

 Émilie Loit /  Åsa Svensson defeated  Petra Mandula /  Patricia Wartusch 6–3, 6–1
 It was Loit's 2nd title of the year and the 6th of her career. It was Svensson's 2nd title of the year and the 8th of her career.

External links
 http://bloomyworld.com/
 Official website 
 ATP Tournament Profile
 WTA Tournament Profile

 
2003
Abierto Mexicano Telefonica Movistar
Abierto Mexicano Telefonica Movistar
February 2003 sports events in Mexico
March 2003 sports events in Mexico